Omorgus scutellaris is a beetle of the family Trogidae. It is found in the United States and Mexico.

References

scutellaris
Insects of Mexico
Beetles of the United States
Taxa named by Thomas Say
Beetles described in 1823